The UK Chagos Support Association is an organization based in the United Kingdom that supports the Chagossian people in advocacy activities and to improve the welfare of Chagossian people in the UK. Its patrons include Ben Fogle and Benjamin Zephaniah. In 2020 it worked with Mauritian-Chagossian artist Audrey Albert.

References

Chagos Archipelago sovereignty dispute
Human rights organisations based in the United Kingdom